The Rike-Kumler Company (commonly known as Rike's) was an American department store in Dayton, Ohio. In 1959, Rike's became part of the Federated Department Stores conglomerate. In 1982, Federated merged Rike's with its Cincinnati unit, Shillito's, in order to form Shillito–Rike's. In 1986, Federated merged Shillito–Rike's into the Columbus-based Lazarus chain, which, in 2005 was consolidated with most other Federated chains under the Macy's brand.

Rike's former main store in downtown Dayton was imploded in 1999 and is now the site of the Benjamin and Marian Schuster Performing Arts Center.

Rike's was well known for its annual tradition of animated Christmas window displays. The animated figurines were preserved and have been displayed yearly during the Christmas season at the Benjamin and Marian Schuster Performing Arts Center since its inception.

History

Rike-Kumler Co 
The company was established as the Rike-Kumler company in downtown Dayton, Ohio in 1853. They would remain independent until 1959 when they joined the Federated Department Stores company, at which time the company owned the then 650,000 sq ft downtown store, a 280,000 sq ft service building, two warehouses, and the Miami Hotel. That same year, Arthur Beerman reportedly offered to sell his chain of Beerman stores to the company, but the offer was turned down by both the Rike-Kumler Co and its new parent, Federated. A branch store, the company's first, was announced as in the works in December 1960, and construction was underway by September 1961 for the new, self-service store in a newly built shopping center in Kettering, Ohio. The store would have a soft opening on October 30, 1961, followed by a grand opening on November 2, 1961, with a number of local mayors and county officials in attendance. The company would open its first mall store on August 22, 1963, at the Salem Mall in Trotwood, Ohio. The company's downtown store was subject of picketing and sit-ins by the Congress of Racial Equality beginning in summer 1963, over alleged hiring discrimination at the store. The protest ended in October 1963, when CORE and the Rike-Kumler company reached an agreement, promising to hire more black workers, give them equal consideration in hiring, and making a pledge to bring on a number of black employees hired for the holiday season on as permanent employees.

Elder-Beerman Antitrust Lawsuit 
Beginning in 1961, the Rike-Kumler Co and parent company Federated Department Stores Inc, were subject to an antitrust lawsuit by competitor Beerman Stores, later Elder-Beerman, accusing the company of trying to smother competition in order to create a monopoly in the Dayton area. It alleged that the Rike-Kumler Co would tell suppliers not to sell to Elder-Beerman, or they would no longer buy from them, and due to their larger buying power, suppliers would choose Rike-Kumler. The second suit, claiming damages of $15 million, was filed in 1966. Elder-Beerman would be awarded damages of $1,275,097, later tripled to $3,750,291 in July 1969 by the U.S. District Court in Dayton. However, a three-judge federal appeals court would reverse the decision in April 1972, sending it back to the district court in Dayton. Rike's would leave the suit in November 1972, after reaching an undisclosed agreement out-of-court.

Expansion and Merger 
The company would continue to open mall-based stores in the early 1970s, including at the Upper Valley Mall and at the Dayton Mall. Another location at Castleton Square was planned, but later replaced with Lazarus, which was also owned by Federated Department Stores. The company would be merged for the first time in 1982, joining with Cincinnati, Ohio based Shillito's to form Shillito-Rike's. The merger was announced at a press conference in Middletown, Ohio, reportedly because it was equidistant to both Cincinnati and Dayton. At this time, Federated vice chairman Donald J. Stone said that the company would not be merged with the Lazarus department store operations, despite rumors. In spite of this, Shillito-Rike's would be merged with Lazarus only four years later, in early 1986, leading to the end of the Rike's name.

References

External links
Wright State University Rike Historical Collection (includes brief company history)

Montgomery County, Ohio
Retail companies established in 1853
Retail companies disestablished in 1982
Defunct department stores based in Dayton, Ohio
1853 establishments in Ohio